Michal Cotler-Wunsh (born 18 December 1970) is an Israeli politician. She served as a member of the Knesset for the Blue and White alliance from 2020 to 2021.

Biography
Cotler-Wunsh was born in Jerusalem; her mother Ariela Ze'evi was secretary of Gahal and Likud during Menachem Begin's leadership. When she was eight years old, her family moved to Montreal after her mother married a Canadian, Irwin Cotler. After leaving high school, she returned to Israel to enrol at the Hebrew University of Jerusalem. A year later she began her national service in the Israel Defense Forces, training new recruits. She returned to the Hebrew University to complete a law degree, after which she began working at the Ministry of Justice. After 13 years in Israel, Cotler-Wunsh moved back to Canada, where she earned a master's degree at McGill University and taught at the university. A decade after leaving Israel, she and her family returned.

She was appointed to the group writing a manifesto for the new Telem party of Moshe Ya'alon, which was established in early 2019. After Telem joined the Blue and White alliance, she was placed forty-sixth on its list for the April 2019 elections, in which it won 35 seats. She was given the same spot for the September 2019 elections, again failing to win a seat. However, she was moved up to thirty-sixth for the March 2020 elections. Although the alliance won only 33 seats, she entered the Knesset on 19 June as a replacement for Alon Schuster, who had resigned his seat under the Norwegian Law after being appointed to the cabinet. Between the election and her entry to the Knesset, she defected to the Israel Resilience Party following a split in the Blue and White alliance. She announced on 29 December that she would be leaving the party.

References

External links

1970 births
Living people
Blue and White (political alliance) politicians
Hebrew University of Jerusalem Faculty of Law alumni
Israel Resilience Party politicians
Israeli civil servants
Israeli expatriates in Canada
Jewish Israeli politicians
McGill University alumni
Academic staff of McGill University
Members of the 23rd Knesset (2020–2021)
People from Jerusalem
Telem (2019 political party) politicians
Women members of the Knesset